Janice & Abbey is a reality-television series following the attempt by British model Abigail Clancy to break into the American modeling market under the guidance of American supermodel Janice Dickinson. The show premiered in the United Kingdom on May 14, 2007, under the title Abbey & Janice: Beauty & The Best and had its American debut on the Oxygen television channel on February 19, 2008.

Episodes

See also

2007 in British television
2008 in American television
List of reality television programs
List of television programs by name
List of television spin-offs

External links
 oxygen.com/janiceandabbey.com, show's official website
 

2000s American reality television series
2008 American television series debuts
2008 American television series endings
American television spin-offs
Reality television spin-offs
The Janice Dickinson Modeling Agency
Modeling-themed reality television series
Oxygen (TV channel) original programming